KTGO (1090 AM, "AM 1090 The Flag") is a radio station licensed to Tioga, North Dakota, United States. The station mainly serves Williston, along with oil field workers in the nearby Bakken Formation.

The station is owned by Bakken Beacon Media LLC. It airs a conservative talk radio format drawn primarily from syndicated programs, including What's On Your Mind (syndicated from KFYR/Bismarck), The Hugh Hewitt Show, The Charlie Kirk Show, Fox Across America, The Chris Berg Show, and The Mark Levin Show. The station's local programming is limited to the one-hour Morning Lowdown with Dennis Lindahl, and local church services on Sunday mornings.

KTGO is a member of the North Dakota Broadcasters Association.

References

External links

 

TGO
Talk radio stations in the United States
Williams County, North Dakota
Radio stations established in 1967
1967 establishments in North Dakota